In numerical analysis, Romberg's method is used to estimate the definite integral  by applying Richardson extrapolation repeatedly on the trapezium rule or the rectangle rule (midpoint rule). The estimates generate a triangular array.  Romberg's method is a Newton–Cotes formula – it evaluates the integrand at equally spaced points.
The integrand must have continuous derivatives, though fairly good results
may be obtained if only a few derivatives exist.
If it is possible to evaluate the integrand at unequally spaced points, then other methods such as Gaussian quadrature and Clenshaw–Curtis quadrature are generally more accurate.

The method is named after Werner Romberg (1909–2003), who published the method in 1955.

Method 
Using , the method can be inductively defined by

In big O notation, the error for R(n, m) is: 

The zeroeth extrapolation, is equivalent to the trapezoidal rule with  points; the first extrapolation, is equivalent to Simpson's rule with  points. The second extrapolation, is equivalent to Boole's rule with  points. The further extrapolations differ from Newton-Cotes formulas. In particular further Romberg extrapolations expand on Boole's rule in very slight ways, modifying weights into ratios similar as in Boole's rule. In contrast, further Newton-Cotes methods produce increasingly differing weights, eventually leading to large positive and negative weights. This is indicative of how large degree interpolating polynomial Newton-Cotes methods fail to converge for many integrals, while Romberg integration is more stable.

A geometric example 
To estimate the area under a curve the trapezoid rule is applied first to one-piece, then two, then four, and so on.

After trapezoid rule estimates are obtained, Richardson extrapolation is applied.

For the first iteration the two piece and one piece estimates are used in the formula  The same formula is then used to compare the four piece and the two piece estimate, and likewise for the higher estimates
For the second iteration the values of the first iteration are used in the formula 
The third iteration uses the next power of 4:  on the values derived by the second iteration.
The pattern is continued until there is one estimate.

MA stands for more accurate, LA stands for less accurate

Example 

As an example, the Gaussian function is integrated from 0 to 1, i.e. the error function erf(1) ≈ 0.842700792949715.  The triangular array is calculated row by row and calculation is terminated if the two last entries in the last row differ less than 10−8.

 0.77174333
 0.82526296  0.84310283
 0.83836778  0.84273605  0.84271160
 0.84161922  0.84270304  0.84270083  0.84270066
 0.84243051  0.84270093  0.84270079  0.84270079  0.84270079

The result in the lower right corner of the triangular array is accurate to the digits shown.
It is remarkable that this result is derived from the less accurate approximations
obtained by the trapezium rule in the first column of the triangular array.

Implementation 
Here is an example of a computer implementation of the Romberg method (in the C programming language):

#include <stdio.h>
#include <math.h>

void print_row(size_t i, double *R) {
   printf("R[%2zu] = ", i);
   for (size_t j = 0; j <= i; ++j) {
      printf("%f ", R[j]);
   }
   printf("\n");
}

/*
INPUT:
(*f) : pointer to the function to be integrated
a    : lower limit
b    : upper limit
max_steps: maximum steps of the procedure
acc  : desired accuracy

OUTPUT:
Rp[max_steps-1]: approximate value of the integral of the function f for x in [a,b] with accuracy 'acc' and steps 'max_steps'.
*/
double romberg(double (*f)(double), double a, double b, size_t max_steps, double acc) 
{
   double R1[max_steps], R2[max_steps]; // buffers
   double *Rp = &R1[0], *Rc = &R2[0]; // Rp is previous row, Rc is current row
   double h = b-a; //step size
   Rp[0] = (f(a) + f(b))*h*0.5; // first trapezoidal step

   print_row(0, Rp);

   for (size_t i = 1; i < max_steps; ++i) {
      h /= 2.;
      double c = 0;
      size_t ep = 1 << (i-1); //2^(n-1)
      for (size_t j = 1; j <= ep; ++j) {
         c += f(a+(2*j-1)*h);
      }
      Rc[0] = h*c + .5*Rp[0]; // R(i,0)

      for (size_t j = 1; j <= i; ++j) {
         double n_k = pow(4, j);
         Rc[j] = (n_k*Rc[j-1] - Rp[j-1]) / (n_k-1); // compute R(i,j)
      }

      // Print ith row of R, R[i,i] is the best estimate so far
      print_row(i, Rc);

      if (i > 1 && fabs(Rp[i-1]-Rc[i]) < acc) {
         return Rc[i];
      }

      // swap Rn and Rc as we only need the last row
      double *rt = Rp;
      Rp = Rc;
      Rc = rt;
   }
   return Rp[max_steps-1]; // return our best guess
}

Here is an example of a computer implementation of the Romberg method in the Javascript programming language.
/**
 * INPUTS
 * func = integrand, function to be integrated
 * a = lower limit of integration
 * b = upper limit of integration
 * nmax = number of partitions, n=2^nmax
 * tol_ae = maximum absolute approximate error acceptable (should be >=0)
 * tol_rae = maximum absolute relative approximate error acceptable (should be >=0)
 * OUTPUTS
 * integ_value = estimated value of integral
 */
function auto_integrator_trap_romb_hnm(func, a, b, nmax, tol_ae, tol_rae) {
  if (typeof a !== 'number') {
    throw new TypeError('<a> must be a number');
  }
  if (typeof b !== 'number') {
    throw new TypeError('<b> must be a number');
  }
  if (!Number.isInteger(nmax) || nmax<1) {
    throw new TypeError('<nmax> must be an integer greater than or equal to one.');
  }
  if ((typeof tol_ae !== 'number') || tol_ae < 0) {
    throw new TypeError('<tole_ae> must be a number greater than or equal to zero');
  }
  if ((typeof tol_rae !== 'number') || tol_rae <= 0) {
    throw new TypeError('<tole_ae> must be a number greater than or equal to zero');
  }
    
  var h = b - a;
  // initialize matrix where the values of integral are stored
  var Romb = []; // rows
  for (var i = 0; i < nmax+1; i++) {
    Romb.push([]);
    for (var j = 0; j < nmax+1; j++) {
      Romb[i].push(math.bignumber(0));
    }
  }

  // calculating the value with 1-segment trapezoidal rule
  Romb[0][0] = 0.5 * h * (func(a)+func(b));
  var integ_val = Romb[0][0];

  for (var i=1; i<=nmax; i++) {
    // updating the value with double the number of segments
    // by only using the values where they need to be calculated
    // See https://autarkaw.org/2009/02/28/an-efficient-formula-for-an-automatic-integrator-based-on-trapezoidal-rule/
	h = h / 2;
    var integ = 0;
    for (var j=1; j<=2**i-1; j+=2) {
      var integ=integ+func(a+j*h)
    }

    Romb[i][0] = 0.5*Romb[i-1][0] + integ*h;
    // Using Romberg method to calculate next extrapolatable value
    // See https://young.physics.ucsc.edu/115/romberg.pdf
    for (k=1; k<=i; k++) {   
      var addterm=Romb[i][k-1]-Romb[i-1][k-1]
      addterm=addterm/(4**k-1.0)
      Romb[i][k] = Romb[i][k-1]+addterm

      //Calculating absolute approximate error
      var Ea = math.abs(Romb[i][k]-Romb[i][k-1])
      //Calculating absolute relative approximate error
      var epsa = math.abs(Ea/Romb[i][k]) * 100.0;
			
      //Assigning most recent value to the return variable
      integ_val = Romb[i][k];

      // returning the value if either tolerance is met
      if (epsa<tol_rae || Ea<tol_ae) {
        return integ_val;
      }
    }
  }
  // returning the last calculated value of integral whether tolerance is met or not
  return integ_val;
}

References

External links 
 ROMBINT – code for MATLAB (author: Martin Kacenak)
Free online integration tool using Romberg, Fox–Romberg, Gauss–Legendre and other numerical methods
SciPy implementation of Romberg's method
Romberg.jl — Julia implementation (supporting arbitrary factorizations, not just  points)

Numerical integration (quadrature)
Articles with example C code